Sabbir Ahmed, SBP, OSP, SGP, ndc, psc, is a retired lieutenant general of Bangladesh Army who served as Chief of General Staff in Bangladesh Army. He also served as General-Officer-Commanding-(GOC) of Army Training and Doctrine Command (ARTDOC). Before that he was GOC of the 24th Infantry Division in Chittagong. He also served as GOC of 66th Infantry Division, Director of Military Training (DMT) of Army Headquarters Military Training Directorate of Bangladesh Army.

References

Living people
Bangladesh Army generals
Year of birth missing (living people)